"How Deep Is Your Love" is a pop ballad written and recorded by the Bee Gees in 1977 and released as a single in September of that year. It was ultimately used as part of the soundtrack to the film Saturday Night Fever. It was a number-three hit in the United Kingdom and Australia. In the United States, it topped the Billboard Hot 100 on 25 December 1977 and stayed in the Top 10 for 17 weeks. It spent six weeks atop the US adult contemporary chart. It is listed at No. 27 on Billboard All Time Top 100. Alongside "Stayin' Alive" and "Night Fever", it is one of the group's three tracks on the list. The song was covered by Take That for their 1996 Greatest Hits album, reaching No. 1 on the UK Singles Chart for three weeks.

"How Deep Is Your Love" ranked number 375 on Rolling Stone list of the 500 Greatest Songs of All Time. In a British TV special shown in December 2011, it was voted The Nation's Favourite Bee Gees Song by ITV viewers. During the Bee Gees' 2001 Billboard magazine interview, Barry said that this was his favourite Bee Gees song.

Composition and recording

Following mixing for Here at Last... Bee Gees... Live, the Bee Gees began recording songs for what was to be the follow-up studio album to 1976's Children of the World. Then the call came from Robert Stigwood requesting songs for a movie he was producing. The Bee Gees obliged and gave him five songs, one of which was "How Deep Is Your Love". This track was written mainly by Barry, Robin and Maurice Gibb. Barry worked out the melody with keyboard player Blue Weaver, though he is not credited officially as a songwriter here. Co-producer Albhy Galuten later admits the contribution of Weaver on this track, "One song where Blue [Weaver] had a tremendous amount of input. There was a lot of things from his personality. That's one where his contribution was quite significant, not in a songwriting sense, though when you play piano, it's almost like writing the song. Blue had a lot of influence in the piano structure of that song".

Weaver tells his story behind this track:

"One morning, it was just myself and Barry in the studio. He said, 'Play the most beautiful chord you know', and I just played, what happened was, I'd throw chords at him and he'd say, 'No, not that chord', and I'd keep moving around and he'd say, 'Yeah, that's a nice one' and we'd go from there. Then I'd play another thing - sometimes, I'd be following the melody line that he already had and sometimes I'd most probably lead him somewhere else by doing what I did. I think Robin came in at some point. Albhy also came in at one point and I was playing an inversion of a chord, and he said, 'Oh no, I don't think it should be that inversion, it should be this', and so we changed it to that, but by the time Albhy had come in, the song was sort of there.

A demo was made at Le Château d'Hérouville in France, with the additional recording done at Criteria Studios when they got back to Miami. As Weaver says, "We started work about 12 o'clock maybe one o'clock in the morning, and that demo was done at about three or four o'clock in the morning. Albhy played piano on the demo, I'd drunk too much or gone to bed or something. Then I woke up the next morning and listened to that, and then put some strings on it and that was it. Then we actually recorded it for real in Criteria. The chords and everything stayed the same, the only thing that changes from that demo is that when we got to Criteria, I worked out the electric piano part which became the basis of the song. It was the sound of the piano that makes the feel of that song." Despite Weaver's absence on the first demo of the song as he fell asleep, Galuten claimed, "Even though I did the demo because he wasn't there, there were a lot of things from his personality [on 'How Deep Is Your Love']".

On the song's lyrics, Barry revealed:

"A lot of the textures you hear in the song were added on later. We didn't change any lyrics, mind you, but the way we recorded it was a little different than the way we wrote in the terms of construction. A little different for the better, I think, the title 'How Deep Is Your Love' we thought was perfect because of all the connotations involved in that sentence, and that was simply it".

There was some talk of Yvonne Elliman recording "How Deep Is Your Love," but, according to Barry, their manager Robert Stigwood said, "You've got to do this song yourself, you should not give it to anybody".

Release and critical reception
"How Deep Is Your Love" was released as a single in September 1977 everywhere except in the UK, where it was released on 29 December 1977. By the time Children of the World was recorded, it was pretty much established that Barry was now the primary vocalist of the group, mostly being falsetto leads with the occasional natural breathy voice. Even most of the backing vocals were done by Barry, such that Robin and Maurice are barely heard in the mix, even though they are there. Despite this, Robin sings the melody for the chorus and audibly sings various ad libs during this song. Two music videos were made for this song, with minimum lights. In one (the precursor to the main music video released later), the brothers are shown singing while a shady image of a woman shows throughout the video, accompanied by a big white light shining around. Barry Gibb had his beard shaven off in this video, the same as in the "Night Fever" video. A second video (the main one) was later made in which features the brothers sing while passing by a stream of rainbow lights. In this video Barry Gibb is bearded. On the Cashbox charts on the week 4 February 1978, when it was at No. 13, the soundtrack's second single "Stayin' Alive" was at No. 1 with "Night Fever" debuted at No. 71 on the same week.

When "How Deep Is Your Love" became a UK #3, Barry exclaimed: "You have no idea what a thrill it is to have a Top Five single in England. With all the new wave and punk rock out, I would have thought something like 'How Deep Is Your Love' wouldn't have a chance. We always kept going forward and we're getting stronger every day".

Billboard described the song as "a warm tender ballad," saying that after a slow beginning it grows to a "heightened expressive delivery."  Cash Box said that it's "a beautifully harmonized, melodic ballad for music lovers of all ages." Record World said that it is "one of their most controlled, delicate efforts, with the vocals almost whispered at times" and that it has "a good melody and expressive love lyric."

The song won Best Pop Performance by a Group at the 20th Grammy Awards which were held on 23 February 1978. The song also received a nomination for Best Original Song at the 35th Golden Globe awards held on 28 January 1978. The award went to "You Light Up My Life" by Kasey Cisyk. At the time of both award ceremonies, the song was still in the Top 10 on the Billboard Hot 100 chart.

Brian Wilson of the Beach Boys spoke positively of the song, stating, "I always liked the Bee Gees very much. 'How Deep Is Your Love' is ... one that I think is really great ... I turn the radio up a little bit when it comes on."

1983 lawsuit

In 1983, the Bee Gees were sued by a Chicago songwriter, Ronald Selle, who claimed that the Gibb brothers stole melodic material from one of his songs, "Let It End", and used it in "How Deep Is Your Love". At trial, the jury returned a finding for Selle. The Bee Gees attorney immediately asked for judgment notwithstanding the verdict. The basis for the motion was that Selle had failed to show, as was required by the law, that the Bee Gees had prior access to his song. Even Selle had admitted that he'd sent out his demo tape to only a few recording companies, none of whom did business with the Bee Gees. Selle also admitted that there were some similarities between his song and several Bee Gee compositions that predated his song by several years, as well as similarities with the Beatles song "From Me to You" written by John Lennon and Paul McCartney (under Lennon-McCartney). The judge ruled in favour of the Bee Gees. Selle appealed the ruling, but it was upheld by the Seventh Circuit Court of Appeals which agreed that Selle had not proven his case.

Jack Taliercio Footage 
Of historical note, an Muzak version of the song was heard playing in the plaza of the World Trade Center during the September 11 attacks, about 20 minutes before the collapse of the South Tower after it was struck by United Airlines Flight 175. Cornered by fire and smoke on the 79th floor where the plane hit, a man was filmed trying to climb down from a window on the southeast side of the South Tower as the song played in the background, before losing his grip and falling to his death at 9:38 A.M, followed by the Muzak version of (Will You) Come Back My Love, by the Wrens.  The playing of the song was viewed as "surreal" against the backdrop of carnage and destruction.

Personnel
Bee Gees
Barry Gibb – lead, harmony and backing vocals, rhythm guitar
Robin Gibb – lead vocals, harmony and backing vocals
Maurice Gibb – bass guitar, harmony and backing vocals

Additional musicians
Alan Kendall – electric guitar
Dennis Bryon – drums, percussion 
Blue Weaver – keyboards, synthesizer, Fender Rhodes Electric Piano
Joe Lala – percussion
Wade Marcus – string arrangements

Technical
 Karl Richardson – engineering
 Michel Marie – assistant engineering

Charts

Weekly charts

Year-end charts

All-time charts

Sales and certifications

Take That version

English pop music group Take That released a cover version as a single from their Greatest Hits compilation in February 1996. This was the first single as a quartet, as Robbie Williams left the group the previous year. The single went on to become what was to be the band's final UK number one until their 2006 comeback single "Patience" a decade later. The song stayed at number one in the UK charts for three weeks. The single sold 671,000 copies and has received a Platinum sales status certification in the UK. The song also topped the charts in Denmark, Ireland, Lithuania, and Spain. In 2018, the band recorded an updated version of the song with Barry Gibb for their greatest hits remix album, Odyssey.

Critical reception
British magazine Music Week rated the song three out of five, adding, "This difficult-to-sing Bee Gees number lack some oomph in this version, which is released as a preview for Take That's forthcoming greatest hits album. A hit, of course, but not one of their biggest." Gerald Martinez from New Sunday Times said it sounds very much like the original. "But then most of their fans have probably not heard the Bee Gees' version. In any case it's a stylish ballad that deserves another hearing."

Music video
The accompanying music video for the song saw the remaining four Take That members tied to chairs in a basement. An obsessive fan with blonde hair and heavy eye makeup who has presumingly kidnapped the band (actress and model Paula Hamilton) walks into the basement and circles the four members individually pulling their hair. She then puts them all into her van and drives down the motorway. She stops by a reservoir and has the four members placed on the edge, she points at each member before grabbing Gary Barlow's rope and pushes him back, still holding on. Her fingers slip through the rope and he falls backwards into the reservoir, still tied to the chair. She initially looks shocked, but then smirks.

Track listing

 UK cassette single (74321 35591 5)
 "How Deep Is Your Love" – 3:41
 "Never Forget" (live from Earl's Court & Manchester Nynex) – 7:38

 UK CD single no. 1 (74321 35559 2)
 "How Deep Is Your Love" – 3:41
 "Every Guy" (live from Earl's Court & Manchester Nynex) – 5:36
 "Lady Tonight" (live from Earl's Court & Manchester Nynex) – 4:13
 "Sunday To Saturday" (live from Earl's Court & Manchester Nynex) – 3:48

 UK CD single no. 2 (74321 35560 2)
 "How Deep Is Your Love" – 3:41
 "Back for Good" (live from Earl's Court & Manchester Nynex) – 7:06
 "Babe" (live from Earl's Court & Manchester Nynex) – 6:10
 "Never Forget" (live from Earl's Court & Manchester Nynex) – 7:38

 European CD single no. 1 (74321 35243 2)
 "How Deep Is Your Love" – 3:41
 "Back For Good" (live from Earl's Court & Manchester Nynex) – 7:06

 European CD single no. 2 (74321 35244 2)
 "How Deep Is Your Love" – 3:41
 "Back for Good" (live from Earl's Court & Manchester Nynex) – 7:06
 "Every Guy" (live from Earl's Court & Manchester Nynex) – 5:36

 Japanese CD single (BVCP-2406)
 "How Deep Is Your Love" – 3:41
 "Every Guy" (live from Earl's Court & Manchester Nynex) – 5:36
 "Babe" (live from Earl's Court & Manchester Nynex) – 6:10
 "Back for Good" (live from Earl's Court & Manchester Nynex) – 7:06

 UK 7-inch vinyl – jukebox release only (74321 35632 2)
 "How Deep Is Your Love" – 3:41
 "Never Forget" (live from Earl's Court & Manchester Nynex) – 7:38

Personnel
 Gary Barlow – lead vocals, backing vocals
 Howard Donald – backing vocals
 Jason Orange – backing vocals
 Mark Owen – backing vocals

Charts and certifications

Weekly charts

Year-end charts

Decade-end charts

Certifications

Other notable versions
1995: American R&B group Portrait, on their album All That Matters (The single reached No. 93 on the Billboard Hot 100, No. 15 in Australia, and No. 1 in New Zealand, where it was certified Gold and ranked No. 6 on the year-end singles chart)
2017: PJ Morton, on his album Gumbo, featuring Yebba (The song won a Grammy Award for Best Traditional R&B Performance)

References

1977 singles
1996 singles
2004 singles
Bee Gees songs
Demis Roussos songs
Take That songs
Billboard Hot 100 number-one singles
Cashbox number-one singles
Grammy Award for Best Traditional R&B Vocal Performance
Number-one singles in Brazil
RPM Top Singles number-one singles
Number-one singles in Denmark
Number-one singles in Finland
Number-one singles in France
Irish Singles Chart number-one singles
Number-one singles in Israel
Number-one singles in Italy
Number-one singles in New Zealand
Number-one singles in Scotland
Number-one singles in Spain
UK Singles Chart number-one singles
Songs from Saturday Night Fever
Music videos directed by Bruce Gowers
Songs written by Barry Gibb
Songs written by Maurice Gibb
Songs written by Robin Gibb
RCA Records singles
RSO Records singles
Polydor Records singles
British soft rock songs
Rock ballads
Songs about heartache
Songs involved in plagiarism controversies
1977 songs
1970s ballads